Ti Amo is the sixth studio album by French band Phoenix. It was released on 9 June 2017 by Loyauté and Glassnote Records. Recording began in 2014 at La Gaîté Lyrique in Paris, an arts centre that was built at the site of a theatre. The band promoted the album by releasing three singles and embarking on a world tour. "J-Boy" was the first single, released on 27 April 2017, "Ti Amo" was the second, released on 18 May. The third single, "Goodbye Soleil" was released on 2 June. The album received generally positive reviews from critics. It was a modest commercial success, peaking at number 17 in France and within the top 40 in Australia, Belgium, and Switzerland.

Composition
Ti Amo has been described as featuring synth-pop and Italo disco throughout. Phoenix said in a press release that the album is about "our European, Latin roots, a fantasized version of Italy", and that the songs focus on "simple, pure emotions: love, desire, lust, and innocence". Guitarist Laurent Brancowitz commented that the album recalls "summer and Italian discos". Daniel Glass, head of Glassnote Records, stated: "I think the record came out of darkness, out of concern. But what's resulted is this incredibly colorful record."

Promotion
The first single, "J-Boy", was released on 27 April 2017, and debuted on Zane Lowe's Beats 1 show. The New York Times noted the song's "midtempo disco pulse", and it was named "Best New Track" by Pitchfork. It was performed live on The Tonight Show Starring Jimmy Fallon on 2 May. The title track was released as the second single on 18 May 2017. It was premiered at a concert in Antwerp in April 2017, along with "J-Boy", "Lovelife" and "Role Model". "Goodbye Soleil" was released for streaming on 2 June.

Phoenix toured North America from 12 May to 15 June 2017, concluding at the Hollywood Bowl in Los Angeles. They then toured Europe and Asia in support of the album until September.

Critical reception

At Metacritic, which assigns a weighted average rating out of 100 to reviews from mainstream critics, the album received an average score of 70, based on 23 reviews, which indicates "generally favorable reviews".

Accolades

Track listing

Sample credits
 "Lovelife" contains a sample of "October (Love Song)" by Chris & Cosey
 "Fleur de Lys" contains a sample of "Expensive Shit" by Fela Kuti

Personnel
Adapted from the album liner notes.

Phoenix
 Deck d'Arcy
 Laurent Brancowitz
 Thomas Mars
 Christian Mazzalai

Additional musicians
 Kinga Burza – phone message 
 Dodi El Sherbini – additional production , keyboards 
 Thomas Hedlund – drums
 Mike Lévy – assistance 

Production
 Michael H. Brauer – mixing 
 Pierre Le Cardinal – audio technical support
 Laurent d'Herbécourt – additional recording
 Pierrick Devin – mixing , production, recording, analog transfer
 Alex Gopher – mastering 
 Jean Marc Harel – audio technical support
 Florian Lagatta – analog transfer
 Joe LaPorta – mastering 
 Steve Vealey – mixing assistance, Pro Tools engineering
 Philippe Zdar – special guidance

Artwork
 Warren Fu – art direction
 Liz Hirsch – design
 Antoine Wagner – photography
 Theo Le Sourd – photography

Charts

References

2017 albums
Glassnote Records albums
Phoenix (band) albums
Italo disco albums
Disco albums by French artists